Sylan (Norwegian), Sylarna (Swedish), or Bealjehkh (Southern Sami) is a mountain range on the border between Norway and Sweden.  The mountain range lies in Trøndelag and Jämtland counties.

There are a number of mountain cabins in the area.  The Norwegian Trekking Association maintains the tourist huts Schultzhytta in Roltdalen, Storerikvollen and Nedalshytta by Nesjøen. On the Swedish side the Swedish Tourist Association maintains the tourist huts Blåhammarens Fjällstation, Sylarnas Fjällstation and Helags Fjällstation. The mountain has a number of relatively small glaciers in its cirques on the eastern side of the main ridge.

Name
Sylan is the finite plural of syl which means "awl". The sharp and pointed peaks of the mountains have been compared with the tool.

Media gallery

References

Mountain ranges of Norway
Mountain ranges of Sweden
Landforms of Trøndelag
Landforms of Jämtland County
Tydal